Sui Airport  is located at Sui in the Balochistan province of Pakistan. It is in use of Pakistan Petroleum Limited employees only.

In June 2004, the airport terminal building was blown up after a terrorist attack.

References

External links

Airports in Balochistan, Pakistan